The Vert, is a left tributary of the Gave d'Oloron, that drains the Barétous in the High-Béarn (Pyrénées-Atlantiques), in the Southwest of France. It flows into the Gave d'Oloron in Moumour, downstream from Oloron-Sainte-Marie.

Vert means 'green' in French, but the river name, Bert in 1467, is related to the Gascon word barta that means 'floodplain'.

The Vert is formed in Aramits from the confluence of:

 (R) the Vert d'Arette, Larron in 1589, from the Chousse Plateau, below the Pic de Guillers, elevation ,
 (L) the Vert de Barlanès, from Issarbe and Lanne-en-Barétous.

References

Rivers of France
Rivers of Pyrénées-Atlantiques
Rivers of Nouvelle-Aquitaine